ARR or Arr may refer to:

People
Jonny Arr (born 1988), English rugby union player
A. R. Rahman (born 1967), Indian film composer, record producer, musician and singer

Places
Arr, Mauritania, a town

Science and technology
Absolute risk reduction, a statistical term used in biostatistics and epidemiology
Address-range register, in computer hardware
Aldosterone-to-renin ratio, a hormone/enzyme blood concentration
Application Request Routing, a proxy-based routing module for Internet Information Services, a Windows-based web server

Transportation
Air Armenia, ICAO airline code ARR
Alaska Railroad, reporting mark ARR
Alberta Resources Railway
Arram railway station, England, National Rail code ARR
Aurora Municipal Airport (Illinois), FAA airport code ARR
Alto Río Senguer Airport, Argentina, IATA code ARR

Other uses
"Arr!", a phrase used by pirates in popular culture
Average Run Rate method, in cricket
Accounting rate of return, a financial ratio
Aeronautica Regala Romana, or Royal Romanian Air Force
Ramarama language, ISO 639-3 code arr
 Artist's resale right or droit de suite, royalties to the original artist upon resale
 Annual Recurring Revenue is a type of revenue stream
 All rights reserved
 Arranged by

See also